Karchelia is a town of 7,000 people about 55 km southeast of Surat, Gujarat, India. 
Karchelia is well-connected with public transport from Surat, Bardoli, Navsari, Ahmedabad and Saputara.

Karchelia is an economic hub of Mahuwa taluka in Surat District, Gujarat, India, due to its prominent shops for grocery, cloths, agricultural supplies, nearby sugar factory, and vibrant agriculture cultivation.

Facilities 
Karchelia garbage recycling center is a model recycling facility in Gujarat.

Karchelia is a home to a government primary school called "Vardha Rashtrya Prathmik school", semi-private primary school and B.B.S. High School, B.Ed. college and I.T.I training school. Karchelia traders are well known for their business acumen in retail and wholesale business and are well connected with politicians.

Seasons 
Karchelia has mild winter (Nov-Mar), Hot Summer (Apr-Jun) and monsoon (Jun-Sept).
Winter temperature are 70 to 90 F, 20-30 C. Summer temperatures are 80-104 F, 30-40 C. Monsoon rain is from 20 June thru Oct and temperature drops but rain can be non-stop for a week at a time. Karchelia does not experience flood, hurricane or earthquake in general. Best time to visit Karchelia is Oct thru March.

See also 
List of tourist attractions in Surat

References

Suburban area of Surat
Cities and towns in Surat district